Krastyu Milev (born 14 September 1969) is a Bulgarian weightlifter. He competed in the men's light heavyweight event at the 1996 Summer Olympics.

References

External links
 

1969 births
Living people
Bulgarian male weightlifters
Olympic weightlifters of Bulgaria
Weightlifters at the 1996 Summer Olympics
Place of birth missing (living people)
20th-century Bulgarian people